The 2007 Cork Premier Intermediate Hurling Championship was the fourth staging of the Cork Premier Intermediate Hurling Championship since its establishment by the Cork County Board in 2004.

On 14 October 2007, Carrigtwohill won the championship following a 3-14 to 3-12 defeat of Watergrasshill in the final. This was their first championship title in the grade.

Results

Round 1

Round 2

Relegation play-offs

Round 3

Quarter-finals

Semi-finals

Final

Championship statistics

Top scorers

Top scorer overall

Top scorers in a single game

Miscellaneous

 Carrigtwohill their first Premier Intermediate title.

References

Cork Premier Intermediate Hurling Championship
Cork Premier Intermediate Hurling Championship